Club Polideportivo Ejido "B" was a Spanish football team from El Ejido, in Almería, Andalusia. Founded in 1996, it was the reserve team of Polideportivo Ejido. The reserve team was dissolved due to the bad general situation of the club.

Season to season

4 seasons in Tercera División

External links
Official website 

Defunct football clubs in Andalusia
 
Association football clubs established in 1996
Association football clubs disestablished in 2010
1996 establishments in Spain
2010 disestablishments in Spain